In geometry, the Japanese theorem states that the centers of the incircles of certain triangles inside a cyclic quadrilateral are vertices of a rectangle.

Triangulating an arbitrary cyclic quadrilateral by its diagonals yields four overlapping triangles (each diagonal creates two triangles). The centers of the incircles of those triangles form a rectangle.

Note that this theorem is easily extended to prove the Japanese theorem for cyclic polygons. To prove the quadrilateral case, simply construct the parallelogram tangent to the corners of the constructed rectangle, with sides parallel to the diagonals of the quadrilateral. The construction shows that the parallelogram is a rhombus, which is equivalent to showing that the sums of the radii of the incircles tangent to each diagonal are equal.

The quadrilateral case immediately proves the general case by induction on the set of triangulating partitions of a general polygon.

See also
Carnot's theorem
Sangaku
Japanese mathematics

References
Mangho Ahuja, Wataru Uegaki, Kayo Matsushita: In Search of the Japanese Theorem (postscript file)
Theorem at Cut-the-Knot
Wataru Uegaki: "" (On the Origin and History of the Japanese Theorem). Departmental Bulletin Paper, Mie University Scholarly E-Collections, 2001-03-01 
Wilfred Reyes: An Application of Thebault’s Theorem. Forum Geometricorum, Volume 2, 2002, pp. 183–185

External links
Japanese theorem, interactive proof with animation

Euclidean plane geometry
Japanese mathematics
Theorems about quadrilaterals and circles